Dinner Party is a collaborative extended play by American musicians Kamasi Washington, Robert Glasper, Terrace Martin, and 9th Wonder. It was released on July 10, 2020, via Sounds Of Crenshaw/Empire. Recording sessions took place at Chalice Recording Studios in Los Angeles at the end of 2019. It features guest appearances from Chicago-based musician Phoelix.

The album debuted at number one on the US Billboard Top Contemporary Jazz Albums, at number two on the Top Jazz Albums and at number fifty-five on the Top Album Sales.

It was supported by single "Freeze Tag" with music video directed by Samantha Whitehead, Brendan Walter and Jasper Graham.

Critical reception

Dinner Party was met with generally favorable reviews from critics. At Metacritic, which assigns a normalized rating out of 100 to reviews from mainstream publications, the album received an average score of 74 based on four reviews. The aggregator Album of the Year has the critical consensus of the album at a 75 out of 100, based on five reviews.

Writing for Exclaim!, Kevin Press said "No one's at the head of the table here. Instead we get a group of friends with genuine history and the kind of outsized talent we can only marvel at. Savour this". Spectrum Culture critic Bob Fish stated, "Everything sounds so good, a blending of genres and forces, combining the worlds of jazz and hip hop, they create the kind of brew that is easy on the ears". AllMusic's Andy Kellman wrote, "The brief set overall evokes some of the same feelings as 9th's Black Radio Recovered remix of "Afro Blue", Kendrick's "These Walls", and much of Martin's Velvet Portraits, all connected and nutritive recordings offering solace and strength. There's no crosstalk, just completed thoughts". Caleb Campbell of Under the Radar said, "Even when the record leaves listeners wishing for just a bit more, it is hard to be that disappointed by an album filled with lush performances from some of the best musicians in their genre".

Track listing

Personnel
Kamasi Washington – main artist, lyrics, producer
Patrick Douthit – main artist, lyrics, producer
Robert Glasper – main artist, lyrics, producer
Terrace Martin – main artist, lyrics, producer
Michael E. Neil – featured artist (tracks: 1-3, 6)
Amani Washington – artwork
Marlon Williams – guitar (tracks: 1, 6)

Dinner Party: Dessert 

Dinner Party: Dessert is a collaborative remix EP by American musicians Kamasi Washington, Robert Glasper, Terrace Martin and 9th Wonder. Released on October 9, 2020 via Sounds of Crenshaw/Empire, the EP serves as an alternate version of the original EP from July, with a wider range of guest artists such as Buddy, Punch, Bilal, Rapsody and Snoop Dogg contributing to the EP's original seven tracks. The EP has been nominated for Best Progressive R&B Album at the 64th Annual Grammy Awards.

Track listing
All lyrics are written by Kamasi Washington, Robert Glasper, Terrace Martin and Patrick Douthit, except where noted; all music is composed by Kamasi Washington, Robert Glasper, Terrace Martin and Patrick Douthit.

Charts

References

2020 EPs
9th Wonder albums
Collaborative albums
Robert Glasper albums
Kamasi Washington albums
Albums produced by 9th Wonder
Albums produced by Terrace Martin